Marcali is a town in Somogy County, Hungary, and the seat of Marcali District.

The settlement is part of the Balatonboglár wine region.

Geography
It lies 14 km south of Lake Balaton, next to the main road 68 and the Somogyszob-Balatonszentgyörgy Railway Line.

Media
Near the village Kisperjés, which belongs to Marcali, there is at  a mediumwave broadcasting station with a 126 metres tall guyed mast radiator broadcasting on 1188 kHz with 300 kW.

Notable people
Aurél Bernáth (1895–1982), painter and art theorist
Béla Pap de Szill (1845–1916), military officer, politician, Minister of Defence (1906)
Endre Bán (1934–1995), Roman Catholic priest, theologist and professor
Mya Diamond (born 1981), pornographic actress and nude model
Árpád Milinte (born 1976), footballer
Olivér Kovács (born 1990), footballer
Márta Vass (born 1962), ultramarathon runner
Beatrix Balogh (born 1974), handballer
Béla Virág (born 1976), footballer
Lukács Bőle (born 1990), footballer
Zoltán Farkas (born 1989), footballer

Twin towns – sister cities

Marcali is twinned with:
 Künzelsau, Germany
 Medulin, Croatia
 Morrovalle, Italy
 Toplița, Romania

Gallery

References

External links

 
Street map 
Marcali Portal 

Populated places in Somogy County
History of Somogy
Hungarian German communities in Somogy County